Paramelisa dollmani is a moth of the family Erebidae. It was described by George Hampson in 1920. It is found in Angola, Uganda and Zambia.

References

Syntomini
Moths described in 1920